Riccardo Rovatti from the University of Bologna, Bologna, Italy was named Fellow of the Institute of Electrical and Electronics Engineers (IEEE) in 2012 for contributions to nonlinear and statistical signal processing applied to electronic systems.

References

Fellow Members of the IEEE
Living people
Year of birth missing (living people)
Place of birth missing (living people)